Martha Boaz (27 October 1911– 24 July 1995) was an American librarian. She earned a B.S. in Library Science in 1937 from George Peabody College. She was the assistant librarian at Carrier Library, then known as Madison Memorial Library, from 1940 to 1949. The library was at James Madison University, then known as Madison College. She received her master's degree in library science in 1950 and her PhD in library science in 1955, both from the University of Michigan. She was the first woman and the third person to earn a PhD in library science from the University of Michigan. She was the dean of the University of Southern California School of Library Science from 1955-1978, its longest-serving dean as of 2005, and some of her records are held at the University Archives of the University of Southern California. She also served as president of the California Library Association from 1962-1963, chair of its Research Committee from 1958-1960, chair of its Intellectual Freedom Committee from 1964-1966, president of its Library Education Division from 1968-1969, on its board of directors in 1972, and as its chair of the Council of Deans from 1977-1978.

Honors
Boaz received the Beta Phi Mu Award in 1974. The reference room of James Madison University's Carrier Library is named in her honor.

References

1911 births
1995 deaths
American librarians
American women librarians
University of Michigan School of Information alumni
20th-century American women